Craugastor rivulus is a species of frogs in the family Craugastoridae.

It is endemic to Guatemala.
Its natural habitats are subtropical or tropical moist lowland forests, subtropical or tropical moist montane forests, and rivers.
It is threatened by habitat loss.

Sources

rivulus
Endemic fauna of Guatemala
Amphibians of Guatemala
Amphibians described in 2000
Taxonomy articles created by Polbot